Lombo Tayeng is an Indian politician from the state of Arunachal Pradesh.

Tayeng was elected unopposed from Mebo seat in the 2014 Arunachal Pradesh Legislative Assembly election, standing as an Indian National Congress candidate. He is a graduate (B.A.) by qualification.

See also
 Arunachal Pradesh Legislative Assembly

References

External links
Lombo Tayeng Janta Pratinidhi profile
MyNeta Profile
Profile

People's Party of Arunachal politicians
Indian National Congress politicians
Living people
Arunachal Pradesh MLAs 2019–2024
Arunachal Pradesh MLAs 2014–2019
Year of birth missing (living people)